Time of Death is a 2013 American documentary television series. It airs on the premium cable station Showtime. The series follows the lives and deaths of eight individuals and their families. It features Nicole "Little" Lencioni, an American music artist and LGBT activist.

References

External links 
 Official site

2010s American documentary television series
2013 American television series debuts
Showtime (TV network) original programming
2013 American television series endings